Barishaki Bonny Cheborion is a Ugandan lawyer and judge, who serves as a justice of the Court of Appeal of Uganda, since September 2015.

Background and education
He was born in present-day Kapchorwa District; his father is the late George William Cheborion (24 November 1928 to 2 March 2014). He attended Makerere University, the oldest and largest public university in Uganda, graduating with a Bachelor of Laws (LLB) degree. Later he obtained a Diploma in Legal Practice, from the Law Development Centre, in Kampala, Uganda's capital city. Barishaki Bonny Cheborion was admitted to the Uganda Bar and is a practicing attorney.

Work experience

Judicial career
In September 2015, he was appointed to the Court of Appeal of Uganda, which doubles as the Constitutional Court of Uganda, where he still sits as of December 2017.

Other considerations
He is a member of the Uganda Law Society.

See also
Kenneth Kakuru
Solome Bossa
Hellen Obura
Remmy Kasule
Supreme Court of Uganda

References

External links
Court halts proceedings against Kato Lubwama

Ugandan judges
Year of birth missing (living people)
Living people
Makerere University alumni
Law Development Centre alumni
Justices of the Court of Appeal of Uganda
People from Eastern Region, Uganda
People from Kapchorwa District